Louis's yellow-shouldered bat (Sturnira luisi) is a species of bat in the family Phyllostomidae. It is found in Colombia, Costa Rica, Ecuador, Panama, and Peru.

References

Sturnira
Mammals of Colombia
Bats of Central America
Mammals described in 1980
Taxonomy articles created by Polbot
Bats of South America